Spellbound is the twenty ninth studio album by American singer Judy Collins released on February 25, 2022 by Cleopatra Records. The album is Collins' first to contain completely original material. It earned Collins a nomination for the Grammy Award for Best Folk Album, her second in the category.

Critical reception

Upon release, Spellbound received positive acclaim from critics. At Metacritic ,which assigns a normalized score out of 100 to reviews from mainstream publications, the album received a score of 67, indicating "generally favorable reviews".

Track listing

References

2022 albums
Judy Collins albums
Cleopatra Records albums